Air Jamaica Ltd v Charlton [1999] UKPC 20 is an English trusts law case, concerning resulting trusts. In it Lord Millett expressed the view that a resulting trust arises because of the absence of intention to benefit a recipient of money.

Facts
Air Jamaica Ltd had set up a pension trust for the benefit of its employees, funded by contributions from its employees' salaries. When the company was privatised, J$400 million was left over in the pension fund. Clause 4 of the pension deed provided that ‘No moneys which at any time have been contributed by the Company under the terms hereof shall in any circumstances be repayable to the Company’. Air Jamaica Ltd wished to remove clause 4, and change clause 13.3 to say that surpluses would be held on trust for the company.

The Judge held that clause 13.3 was void, going against the rule against perpetuity, and so the surplus passed on trust as bona vacantia to the Crown. The Court of Appeal held that the surplus should be dealt under the rules of the scheme, by the trustees.

Advice
The Privy Council advised that a resulting trust of the surplus funds could still arise in favour of the company, and so it would not be bona vacantia. Clause 13.3 would usually be void for perpetuity because there was no statutory exemption in Jamaica to the common law rule. But with each new member, there was a new settlement, and each member was a life in being, so the termination of a new settlement could in fact be calculated, and so the scheme was in fact not void for perpetuity. The powers for the trustees to change the settlement’s terms were void for perpetuity, and so was the power for the widows to designate a beneficiary to receive benefits, because these were only contingent on termination of the plan itself which could occur more than 21 years after the death of any particular beneficiary. (The individual settlements were contingent on the death of each individual beneficiary under the scheme.) In any event, the scheme’s terms prohibited granting beneficial rights in the scheme to the company in clause 4. But a resulting trust for the company could still exist.

Lord Millett remarked that although Mr Vandervell, in Re Vandervell No 2 did not wish the share option to result to him, he did not wish to make an outright gift to the trustee company either. A presumption in the transferor’s favour can only be made where there is no evidence that there was an intention to create a trust, or make a gift, or make a loan of the property to the transferee.

Lord Steyn, Lord Hope, Sir Christopher Slade and Sir Andrew Leggatt concurred.

See also

English trusts law
English land law
English property law

Notes

References

English trusts case law
Judicial Committee of the Privy Council cases on appeal from Jamaica
1999 in Jamaica
1999 in case law